North Kansas City High School (also known as NKCHS, NKC, and Northtown) is a high school in North Kansas City, Missouri, United States, with over 1,900 students enrolled. It is a part of the North Kansas City School District.

The first graduating class found of record was in 1917 with three known graduates. The school began as an all-white school, due to the inhabitants of the community, and is now one of the most diverse and integrated schools in the nation.

Since July 2001, Northtown has been an International Baccalaureate World School with Dr. Jane Reed as the program coordinator.

Its boundary includes North Kansas City, Avondale, and portions of Gladstone south of NW Englewood Road.

History
Throughout the school's history, several buildings have been built and torn down. Currently, the only remaining building of the original multi-building campus is the three-story Main building. Northtown began significant renovations beginning the fall of 2016. As of the 2020–2021 school year, the renovations are complete with the addition of A, B, and C wings. A Building, containing a new performing arts center and orchestra, band, choir, woodshop, and theatre classrooms, was finished in August 2020. B Building, containing numerous new classrooms and study rooms, was finished before the onset of the 2018–2019 school year. C Building, containing a new cafeteria, main gymnasium and auxiliary gymnasium,  weight room, and locker rooms, was completed for the 2018–2019 school year. Additionally, the old Main building underwent massive renovations to fix safety concerns and put in a new multimedia center and more classrooms. Northtown was one of the only local schools to have an open campus. However, this changed with the completion of the schools' renovation; the campus is now a closed campus. Students and alumni may recall buildings such as the "Academy" or "South Campus" and the Norclay building (on the other side of Howell street). Both were closed at the beginning of the 2020–2021 school year as well, and the "Academy" or "South Campus" (south of the Main building) was torn down and replaced by a parking lot.

The stone wall around the NKCHS football field was created as a works project during the Great Depression. It has been ranked the Most Interesting High School Football Field in the Kansas City area by the Kansas City Star, and has been used for local commercials, including Metro Sports.

The current main building was contracted to be built the first of March, 1925 as documented in the 1925 NKCHS Owl Yearbook for a total cost of $190,000. The contract was awarded to Fritzlen & Hufford Construction in Liberty, Missouri. The 1926 NKCHS Owl yearbook describes the opening and dedication of the new building on Sunday afternoon, January 24, 1926 by Missouri Governor Baker.

One of the buildings where classes were held was the Hiram McElroy Dagg building.

Mascot
The school's mascot is the hornet. Although many have thought the original mascot was an owl, no evidence of that exists in NKCHS yearbooks. There is, however, evidence of the hornet mascot in the 1929 yearbook. The confusion comes with the name of the yearbook from 1924 through 1949; which was The Owl. High school jewelry like pins also bore the image of an owl; however, there is no evidence that the owl was the school's mascot. In the 1929 Owl yearbook, the Pep Squad states, "All right, let's everybody give fifteen big "Rahs" for the "Hornets". In the 1930 NKCHS Owl yearbook, the hornet is shown on basketball players' shirts.

Yearbook
The Owl yearbook was printed from 1924 through 1949. No yearbook was printed in 1933, 1932 or 1927 for reasons unknown. The school adopted a new name for the yearbook in 1950: the Purgold.

Athletics
In the 2019 season, the women's basketball team defeated Jefferson City High School in the state championship game. Head Coach Jeff Lacy was also named Coach of the Year.

Competitive teams include:

Men's and women's teams
Soccer
Swimming and diving
Tennis
Golf
Track and field
Cross country
Basketball
Wrestling

Men's only
Baseball
Football

Women's only
Softball
Cheerleading
Pom/dance squad
Volleyball

Clubs

 A Cappella Choir
 Anime Club
 Chamber Choir
 Color Guard
 Concert band
 FIRST Robotics (Team 5098 – STING – R)
 Foreign Language Club (German, French, Spanish)
 Freshman Orchestra
 Genders and Sexualities Alliance
 Guitar Club
 Harmonaires Show Choir
 International Thespian Society Troupe 2191
 Jazz Band
 Marching band
 Men's Choir
 National Honors Society
 Northtown Theatre Association
 Debate
 Scholar Bowl
 Science Olympiad
 Student Council
 Symphonic Band
 Symphonic Orchestra
 Treble Choir

Notable alumni

Lauren Arthur, state representative, state senator
 Robin Wayne Bailey, a.k.a. Robert Bailey,  Class of 1970, author
 Charlie Broomfield, Class of 1956, Missouri Democratic politician
 Al Conway,  Class of 1948, All-American running back (1952), 1st round draft choice for the Philadelphia Eagles, NFL umpire, Super Bowl official, NAIA Hall of Fame, William Jewell College Hall of Fame, Missouri Sports Hall of Fame, North Kansas City High School Football Coach and math teacher
 Connie Dover,  Class of 1976, singer, Emmy Award-winning producer and composer
 Bill Kelso, Class of 1958, Major League Baseball player and scout, owner of Kelso's Pizza restaurants
 Mark Patton, Class of 1976, actor, Nightmare on Elm Street 2: Freddie's Revenge, Come Back To The Five & Dime, Jimmy Dean, Jimmy Dean, Never Sleep Again – The Elm Street Legacy; soap opera General Hospital
 Rodolfo "Rudy" Reyes, Class of 1990, actor and author
 Rick Scott,  Class of 1970, United States Senator from Florida, 45th Governor of Florida
 Katheryn Shields, Class of 1964, Jackson County executive, Missouri Democratic politician
 Trent Skaggs, Class of 1991, Missouri Democratic state representative
 Phil Snowden, Class of 1956, former University of Missouri quarterback, Missouri Democratic state senator, and curator, University of Missouri
 Garrett Stutz, Class of 2008, professional basketball player

References

Educational institutions established in 1925
Public high schools in Missouri
High schools in Clay County, Missouri
1925 establishments in Missouri